"Can't Make Up My Mind" is a song by DJ/singer Sonique released in May 2003. The song reached number 17 on the UK Singles Chart, spending four weeks in the top 75, while also charting on the Romanian Top 100 at 55.

Track listing
"Can't Make Up My Mind" (Original 7 Inch Mix)
"Can't Make Up My Mind" (Robbie Rivera Full Vocal)
"Can't Make Up My Mind" (Michael Woods Remix)
"Can't Make Up My Mind" (Sonique Platinum Dust Mix)
"Can't Make Up My Mind" (Video)

Charts

References

2003 singles
2003 songs
Sonique (musician) songs
Song articles with missing songwriters